Robin Haase and Matwé Middelkoop defeated Maxime Cressy and Albano Olivetti in the final, 7–6(7–4), 4–6, [10–6] to win the doubles tennis title at the 2023 Open Sud de Franc.

Pierre-Hugues Herbert and Nicolas Mahut were the reigning champions, but Herbert withdrew before the tournament began. Mahut was scheduled to partner Vasek Pospisil, but the pair withdrew before their first-round match due to Pospisil's elbow injury.

Seeds

Draw

Draw

References

External links
 Main draw

Open Sud de France